Tony Hughes is an American actor and singer. As an actor, he starred in The Lost Islands (1976), Chopper Squad (1977–1979) and the film adaptation of Puberty Blues (1981). As a singer he has fronted Bellydance and King Tide.

Hughes was born in England and moved to Australia at age 12. He moved into acting in the 1970s, first appearing in an episode of The Rovers. He then appeared in the entire The Lost Islands and Chopper Squad series. He made his first feature film appearance in a small part in My Brilliant Career. He was then a major cast member of Puberty Blues. After a few more small parts he moved into music, playing with Bellydance until they disbanded and then forming King Tide.

Filmography
TV
 The Lost Islands (1976) as Tony (26 episodes)
 Chopper Squad (1977–1979) as Tim Gray (27 episodes)

 Whidunnit? (1972-1978) as Shaun Connor (1 episode)
Film
 Puberty Blues (1981) as Danny

References

External links
 

Australian male film actors
Australian male singers
Australian male television actors
Living people
1928 births